Kisii School is a public high school in Kisii, Kenya for boys. It was established in 1934 and is today a leading public school providing an education to students drawn from all over Kenya.

History
Kisii School was established in July 1934 as Government African School (GAS) Kisii. The previous year 1933, the governor of Kenya Sir Joseph Byrne visited Kisii and the leaders of the district presented to him a joint petition by the Luo/Suba Council and the Kisii/Kuria Council about their desire to have a Government school in Kisii. The governor asked them to pool resources and the government would assist them put up the school. In 1933, the joint session of the two councils (which would later merge and became known as the South Kavirondo Local Native Council), voted to provide Sh. 120,000 for the establishment of the school on a shared basis with an additional Sh. 3,000 for equipment. Nyaribari location chief Musa Nyandusi agreed to provide land for the construction of the school which was located just outside Kisii township. Work began in January 1934 led by teams of masons from the Kabete Industrial Training Depot and by July that year, the school was ready to take in the first pupils. Some 300 pupils from across the district were invited to sit an entrance examination for the first class in Standard III to be admitted in January 1935. They were competing for only 60 slots in the school. The pupils who passed were mainly from Luo Nyanza and the school being a joint project, the district commissioner ordered a retake of the examination to ensure that more Kisii and Kuria pupils would be admitted to the school.

Development of the School
1935- January: the first pupils sat in the Standard III class. Charles A. Berridge, a native of Canada, was appointed the first principal of the school. He remained at GAS Kisii until 1939 when he moved to Government African School Kitui.

1935- February: Governor Sir Joseph Byrne keeps his promise to open the school but falls ill and cancels at the last minute. He sent the acting Chief Native Commissioner Sydney Hugh La Fontaine to open the school on his behalf. La Fontaine was received by the district commissioner Major J.V. Dawson.

1938- Presented the first candidate for Primary School Examinations. By now, the school had 60 pupils in 2 streams of 30 each. The students had to be 50% Kisii and 50% Luo (Kisii 30 Pupils, Luo 30 pupils)

1945- The Secondary School section was started. At that time, this was called the Junior Secondary- equivalent to standard 7 and 8. The population was still 60 per class.

1946 - Presented the first student for Kenya African Preliminary Examination.

1949 - Started the senior secondary (from 3 and 4) These candidates were to be prepared for KASSE (Kenya African Secondary School Examination)

1950 - Presented candidates for KASSE (Kenya African Secondary School Examination)

1953 -The school admitted candidates for a P3 teacher training course which lasted 3 years. It was later shifted to Kabianga Teachers College (present-day Kabianga University) before later on moving to present-day Kericho Teachers Training College.

1956 - The school entered its first candidates for Cambridge School Certificate. A total of 60 students were registered.

1962- The school was among the 6 schools to introduce 'A' LEVEL (Art) with a single stream of 30 students.

1963 - Presented its first Higher School Certificate candidates commonly referred to as A-Level Examination.

1967 - The 'A' level science class or science stream was started. By now, the student population was 450 (form 1 to 6)

The School
The school has had a strong connection to the family of powerful colonial-era senior chief Musa Barare Nyandusi. He personally organized to have the land on which the entire school stands procured for the purposes of developing the school. Together with Chief Paul Mboya of Karachuonyo, they petitioned the government for the establishment of the school. Nyandusi's son former cabinet minister the late Hon. Simeon Nyachae, (1932-2021) was one of the notable alumni of the school.

Curriculum
The secondary school curriculum emphasizes job-oriented courses, such as business and technical education.

Kisii School offers a college preparatory program following the Kenya Certificate of Secondary Education curriculum. The curriculum offered at the school covers six areas: Communication subjects, Mathematics and Sciences, Humanities, Applied Education, Physical Education.

Communication - English, Kiswahili, French and German
Sciences - Mathematics, Chemistry, Biology and Physics
Humanities - Geography, History and Government, Religious education, Social Education, and Ethics
Applied Education - Agriculture, Industrial education, Wood technology, Metal technology, Power mechanics, Electrical technology, Business education (Accounts, Commerce, Economics), Music, Fine Arts, Drawing and Design, Information Technology (computer studies).
Physical Education -

Governance
Kisii School is a National Public School and it receives a large amount of public money from the government.
The Board of Governors(B.O.G.) and the Parent Teachers Association(P.T.A.) oversee the smooth running of the institution.
The daily routine business of the school is headed by the Office of the Principal.

Admission
Admission of students is by open competitive K.C.P.E. examination every year.
Candidates are judged according to need and parental income and their performance in the national KCPE examinations. Selection is solely based on merit.
Scholarships and financial support comes from Government, various organisations, individuals and donors.

Student life
The school has dormitories, dining hall, classroom block, and Computer and Science laboratories. There are Technical Education workshops for Woodwork, Metalwork, Electricity, Power mechanics, and Agriculture. Students take part in the caring of the livestock and vegetables which supplement their school diet.

Hall of Residence
The school has eight houses. They are:
  Sameta      Light blue,
  Mara        Light Grey,
  Kuja        Navy Blue,
  Kiong'anyo  White,
  Manga       Yellow,
  Homa        Orange,
  Ruri        Green,
  Wire        Red,
 Longonot Purple
Kilimanjaro Dark Green
Ruwenzori Maroon

Inter-house competitions
There are activities in which the houses compete - Science congress, athletics, cross-country, ball games, drama and academics.

The school principal, Maurice Odera usually offers a reward for the top three houses in each field.

Extracurricular activities
Extracurricular activities include drama, choir, publications such as the School Magazine; school leadership through the prefects' body, Sunday School teaching, Scouting, Debate Club, Wildlife Club, Environmental Club, Journalism Club, Science Club, Computer Club, SDA Society, CU and YCS for the Catholics.

Sports
Choices include basketball, rugby, soccer, track and field, hockey, volleyball, handball, swimming, and lawn tennis. Individuals and teams have won national and regional honours in almost all of them.

Under the leadership of John L. O Kinaro,(1991–1998) a former principal, Kisii school emerged as the best soccer school teams in the 1990s. They won three consecutive national championships between 1996 and 1999. Most of the team members have played for the national team, and some are playing professional football in Europe and Asia.

Notable alumni

Ratemo Michieka - former Vice-Chancellor of Jomo Kenyatta University
John Henry Okwanyo - former Cabinet Minister of Commerce & Industry, the Government of the Republic of Kenya
John Machethe Muiruri - Belgium 1st division soccer mid-fielder
Simon Mulama -  former Mathare United footballer
Simeon Nyachae - former Leader Ford People Party and Minister of Roads and Transportation in Kenya; Kenya presidential candidate in 2002
George Nyamweya - Member of the National Assembly
Henry Nyandoro - former Shabana Kisii and Kenyan International Footballer
Robert Ouko - Athlete 400 Relay Gold Medalist at the 1972 Munich Olympics
James Ongwae - 1st Governor of Kisii County
Chris Obure - 1st Senator of Kisii County
David Maraga - Retired Chief Justice of the Republic of Kenya
Wycliffe Oparanya - 1st Governor of Kakamega County
Fred Matiang'i - Cabinet Secretary in the Government of Kenya
Cornel Rasanga Amoth - 1st Governor of Siaya County
Dalmas Otieno, Former Cabinet Minister and MP for Rongo
Joshua Oigara, CEO KCB Group Limited
Joseph Odero-Jowi, Ambassador of Kenya to the United Nations; Minister for Economic Planning & Development

References

External links
 Official site by school http://www.kisiischool.ac.ke/
 Alumni sponsored site http://kisiischool.com/
 Alumni site http://alumni.kisiischool.com/

Educational institutions established in 1911
High schools and secondary schools in Kenya
Education in Nyanza Province
Public schools in Kenya
Boys' schools in Kenya
1911 establishments in Kenya